La leona (English: The Lioness) is a Mexican telenovela produced by Televisa and broadcast by Telesistema Mexicano in 1961.

Cast 
 Amparo Rivelles as Alicia
 Ernesto Alonso
 Augusto Benedico
 Guillermo Murray
 Jacqueline Andere as María
 María Antonieta de las Nieves
 Prudencia Griffel
 Luis Bayardo
 Gerardo del Castillo
 Malena Doria
 Ada Carrasco
 Judy Ponte
 Arturo Benavides
 Eduardo MacGregor

References

External links 

Mexican telenovelas
1961 telenovelas
Televisa telenovelas
1961 Mexican television series debuts
1961 Mexican television series endings
Spanish-language telenovelas